Brian Michael Firkus (born August 23, 1989), better known by the stage name Trixie Mattel, is an American drag queen, television personality, and singer-songwriter originally from Milwaukee, Wisconsin. She is known for her exaggerated, high-camp style and blend of comedy and acoustic pop. In 2015 she competed on the seventh season of the drag competition RuPaul's Drag Race. In 2018, she went on to win the third season of RuPaul's Drag Race All Stars.

Mattel stars in the World of Wonder web series UNHhhh (2016–present), its Viceland spin-off The Trixie & Katya Show (2017–2018), and the Netflix web series I Like to Watch (2019–present), alongside fellow drag queen and frequent collaborator Katya Zamolodchikova. Together, they form the popular comedy duo known as Trixie and Katya. Mattel's music style is primarily folk and country, with her first and second studio albums Two Birds (2017) and One Stone (2018) both charting on the Billboard Folk Albums chart at number sixteen. Her third studio album Barbara (2020) featured an "electro-folk" sound and her first EP Full Coverage, Vol. 1 (2021) consists of Mattel's covers of various songs. Her comedy special, Trixie Mattel: One Night Only (2020) was nominated for a Critics' Choice Television Award. She appears as a judge on the competition series Queen of the Universe (2021–present). She also starred in and produced Trixie Motel, a limited docuseries where she and her boyfriend, David Silver, renovated a rundown motel in Palm Springs, California (2022).

Along with Zamolodchikova, Mattel published her first book, Trixie and Katya's Guide to Modern Womanhood (2020), which became a New York Times bestseller. She appeared on New York Magazine's list of "The Most Powerful Drag Queens in America", ranking fourth. She also operates a YouTube channel focused on beauty and music, with frequent collaborations with fellow drag queens, and celebrities such as Iggy Azalea, Nicole Byer, and Margaret Cho. Mattel's business ventures include being the founder and CEO of Trixie Cosmetics, a cosmetics brand that launched in 2019. Her persona is inspired by her love of Barbie dolls; she owns a large collection of Barbies that she has shared in videos on her YouTube channel.

Life and career

19892014: Early life and career beginnings 
Brian Michael Firkus was born on August 23, 1989, in Milwaukee, Wisconsin. He is Ojibwe and comes from a Native American family in Crivitz, Wisconsin. He had an abusive stepfather who would call him a "Trixie" when he acted feminine, which later inspired his drag name. Her last name was inspired by her affinity for Mattel Barbie dolls and children's toys. Before deciding on "Trixie Mattel" as his drag name, he originally considered the name Cupcake. He moved in with his grandparents at age 15. His grandfather was a country musician who taught him how to play the guitar.

After graduating from high school, Firkus studied at the Peck School of the Arts in the University of Wisconsin–Milwaukee, where he received a BFA in musical theatre and was introduced to drag while performing in a production of The Rocky Horror Show at the Oriental Theatre. He first performed in drag at LaCage NiteClub in Milwaukee, becoming a regular performer in Milwaukee's drag scene. He would perform with fellow drag queens Kim Chi and Shea Couleé in Milwaukee, and would also occasionally perform in Chicago. He attended beauty school in 2014 before withdrawing to participate in RuPaul's Drag Race. Outside of drag, he worked in cosmetics at the time, freelancing at Sephora and working at Ulta and MAC.

20152017: RuPaul's Drag Race, UNHhhh, Two Birds, and The Trixie & Katya Show
Mattel first gained widespread attention as a competitor in Season 7 of RuPaul's Drag Race, in 2015. She was first eliminated in episode four and later reentered the competition in episode eight by winning the "Conjoined Twins" challenge with Pearl Liaison. Mattel was once again eliminated in episode 10, placing sixth overall and becoming the first queen to last more than one episode after returning to the competition. After her run on the show, Mattel performed her stand-up comedy tour Ages 3 and Up from 2015 to 2017.

In October 2015, Mattel guest-starred in a special edition of WOWPresents' Fashion Photo Review with fellow season seven contestant Katya Zamolodchikova. World of Wonder later launched UNHhhh, a comedy web series featuring the duo. The series became one of the most successful shows on the WOW Presents YouTube channel and earned them their first Streamy Award nomination for Show of the Year at the 7th Streamy Awards. In November 2016, Mattel had a guest appearance as herself on American Horror Story: Roanoke. Mattel self-released her debut studio album Two Birds on May 2, 2017. The album debuted at number two on the Heatseekers Albums chart, number six on the Independent Albums chart, and number 16 on the Americana/Folk Albums chart. In December 2017, Mattel released Homemade Christmas, an EP of three recorded Christmas songs that featured Zamolodchikova.

Firkus is openly gay. Since 2016, he has been in a relationship with filmmaker David Silver, who also produced his documentary Moving Parts. He is a vegetarian and also an atheist.

In October 2017, it was announced that UNHhhh would come to an end after its second season. Shortly after, a television spin-off of UNHhhh for Viceland called The Trixie and Katya Show premiered. The show ran until March 2018. Midway through the season, Zamolodchikova suffered a mental health crisis triggered by a relapse into addiction, which caused her to be replaced by Bob the Drag Queen for the remainder of the season. Mattel and Zamolodchikova later reunited in October 2018 for a third season of UNHhhh.

In November 2017, Mattel and Zamolodchikova starred in a drag stage adaptation of the 1997 cult film Romy and Michele's High School Reunion, entitled Trixie and Katya's High School Reunion. Also in November 2017, Mattel produced a video for GQ Magazine Trixie Mattel Makes a PB&J (and More Importantly, a Cocktail), earning a nomination from the James Beard Foundation Awards in the humor category.

20182019: All Stars, One Stone, and Moving Parts
Mattel later returned to the Drag Race franchise for the third season of RuPaul's Drag Race: All Stars, which started airing on January 25, 2018. On March 15, 2018, her fellow competitors voted for her to advance to the final two, where she ultimately won against runner-up Kennedy Davenport in the final lipsync battle. In December 2018, she competed on the television special RuPaul's Drag Race Holi-slay Spectacular and won in a tie with the other competitors.

On February 3, 2018, Mattel released an acoustic version of her song "Moving Parts" as a tease for her upcoming album. It became her first charting single, peaking at number 83 on the Scottish Single Chart. She dropped her second studio album, One Stone, on March 15, 2018, the same night as the All Stars finale. The album peaked at number 16 on the Folk Albums chart, number ten on the Independent albums chart, and number one on the Heatseekers chart, becoming Mattel's first album to reach the top spot on a Billboard chart.

In April 2018, she launched her new comedy world tour Now with Moving Parts, followed by the Super Bowl Cut tour later that same year. A documentary film titled Trixie Mattel: Moving Parts premiered at the Tribeca Film Festival in April 2019, and screened until May 2019. It documents Mattel as she embarks on her "Moving Parts" tour following her All Stars win, as well as her personal struggles. The documentary was made available on Video On Demand platforms on December 3, 2019. An accompanying acoustic soundtrack was released later in December. Mattel's first comedy special, Trixie Mattel: Skinny Legend, aired on OutTV in Canada on September 26, 2019.

20192021: Barbara, Trixie & Katya's Guide to Modern Womanhood, The Bald and the Beautiful, and Full Coverage, Vol. 1
In a September 2018 interview with Billboard, she announced that she was working on her third studio album, Barbara, featuring an "electro-folk" sound. "Yellow Cloud" was released as the first single from the album on May 17, 2019, though it did not make the final cut. "Malibu" was released as the official first single on January 24, 2020 and the album was released a week later through Producer Entertainment Group and ATO Records. The album later received a GLAAD Media Award nomination for Best Breakthrough artist.

In January 2019, Mattel and Zamolodchikova launched the fourth season of UNHhhh. In June 2019, Mattel was one of 37 drag queens featured on the cover of New York magazine. The magazine ranked the 100 most powerful drag queens in America and placed Mattel at number 4.

During the COVID-19 pandemic, filming of the fifth season of UNHhhh was put on hold. In its place, Mattel and Zamolodchikova launched Trixie and Katya Save the World, a spin-off filmed from their homes. Mattel also took the time to start building her YouTube channel, which previously featured make-up tutorials and music videos, and expanded to include content reflecting her pastime as a toy collector, with videos reviewing new Barbie collections, talking about doll history, or baking with Easy Bake Ovens. Mattel and Zamolodchikova resumed filming the fifth season of UNHhhh later in 2020 and launched their podcast The Bald and the Beautiful. On July 14, 2020, Mattel and Zamolodchikova released Trixie and Katya's Guide to Modern Womanhood, an affectionate parody of women's self-help books. The book was a New York Times best-seller.

In September 2020, Mattel released a cover of Lana Del Rey's "Video Games", which charted at number 66 on the Scottish singles chart and number 89 on the UK Downloads chart. In December 2020, it was announced that Mattel and Zamolodchikova would co-host the 10th Streamy Awards in Los Angeles. In the same ceremony, the duo was nominated for Show of the Year and Unscripted Series for UNHhhh, winning the latter category.

In February 2021, Mattel released a cover of the Violent Femmes track "Blister in The Sun", and announced the EP Full Coverage, Vol. 1, which included the two aforementioned singles, as well as a cover of "Jackson" with Orville Peck. The EP was released on April 30, 2021. In May 2021, it was announced that Mattel would star in Trixie Motel, a reality series on Discovery+ that would follow Mattel's efforts to renovate an old motel in Palm Springs. In mid 2021 it was hinted, then formally announced on July 1, 2021, that Mattel will co-star in a dating show with Zamolodchikova, to help her find a partner.

In August 2021, Mattel and Zamolodchikova launched a newsletter, including light-hearted advice, Gooped. In November 2021, Mattel announced "The Trixie Doll", a collectible fashion doll in her likeness,  in collaboration with Integrity Toys.

2021–present: The Blonde & Pink Albums, Trixie Motel, and Working Girls
In December 2021, the drag queen singing competition Queen of the Universe premiered, featuring Mattel as one of the four judges. On November 12, 2021, Mattel released the single "Hello Hello" which is loosely inspired by 60s power pop. The music video was choreographed by fellow drag race alumna Laganja Estranja. Joseph Longo of Them said: "With “Hello Hello,” Mattel makes her case for pop star status — elaborate choreography, suave backup dancers, expressive makeup, and a sparkly mini-dress." The single "This Town" featuring Shakey Graves followed on January 28, 2022, along with the announcement of her fourth studio album, a double album called The Blonde & Pink Albums. The third single "C'mon, Loretta" was released on April 15, 2022, with the full 14-track album following in June 2022.

In fall 2021 Trixie Mattel began renovating a motel in Palm Springs with her partner David Silver. The renovation process was documented in the Discovery+ limited series Trixie Motel, which premiered on June 3, 2022.

On April 8, 2022 it was announced that Trixie and Katya's second book, Working Girls: Trixie & Katya's Guide to Professional Womanhood will be released on October 25, 2022. The book will include "advice for people entering the modern workplace, including satirical tips for choosing a career path, navigating the 'Nine Circles of Retail Hell,' corporate culture, grappling with suspicions that your colleague 'doesn't really hope their emails finds you well,' and the inevitable sailing into one's retiree era." as well as quizzes and an aptitude test.

Business ventures

Trixie Cosmetics
On May 1, 2019, Mattel announced that she would be releasing her make-up brand, Trixie Cosmetics, later that month and it would be available at RuPaul's DragCon LA on May 24, 2019. Mattel had previously dipped into the makeup industry with her Oh Honey! collaboration with independent makeup brand Sugarpill Cosmetics in 2018.

In 2020, Trixie Cosmetics launched a collaboration collection with Zamolodchikova called "Red Scare".

This Is It!
In February 2021, Mattel announced that she had become co-owner of Wisconsin's oldest LGBTQ+ bar, This Is It!, located in Milwaukee, Wisconsin.

Trixie Motel 
Mattel and her partner David Silver bought a motel in Palm Springs, California originally named the Coral Sands Inn for $1.9 million. She had planned to transform it into an AirBnB to rent out, but changed her mind after viewing the property, and decided to pump in an additional $500,000 to renovate the motel to reflect the aesthetics of her drag persona, and enlisting designer Dani Dazey to collaborate on the project. The renovation process has been chronicled in a Discovery+ original series aptly titled Trixie Motel. The series is available to stream on HBO Max starting December 14, 2022.

Artistry 
In addition to her comedic drag persona, Mattel is also a country folk singer-songwriter. Speaking to Rolling Stone, Mattel listed her primary influences as June Carter Cash and Dolly Parton and states that she grew up on the music of George Jones, Conway Twitty, and Johnny Cash. She is also a fan of Jason Isbell, Kris Kristofferson, Aimee Mann, Michelle Branch, and Kacey Musgraves. Several of Mattel's influences for the finished version of her third studio album, Barbara, include The Go-Go's, Blondie, The B-52's, Fountains of Wayne, Weezer, Aimee Mann, and The Click Five.

Filmography

Film

Television

Web series
{| class="wikitable plainrowheaders sortable"
|-
! scope="col" | Year
! scope="col" | Title
! scope="col" | Role
! scope="col" | Notes
! style="text-align: center;" class="unsortable"| 
|-
| rowspan=2|2015
|Bestie$ for Ca$h
|Herself
|Episode: "Katya Zamo & Trixie Mattel"
|
|-
|Fashion Photo RuView
|Herself
|Episode: "RuView of Raja & Raven"
|
|-
| 2015, 2018
|Whatcha Packin'''
|Herself
|2 episodes
|
|-
|2015, 2017, 2019
|Hey Qween!|Herself
|4 episodes
|
|-
| 2015
|Transformations with James St. James|Herself
|Episode: "Trixie Mattel"
|
|-
|rowspan=2| 2016
|Hot T|Herself
|2 episodes
|
|-
|Gay of Thrones|Herself
|Season 6, Episode 4: "Thrust of the Stranger"
|style="text-align: center;"|
|-
|2016–present
|UNHhhh|Herself (co-host)
|7 seasons, 183 episodeswith Katya Zamolodchikova
|style="text-align: center;"|
|-
|2018
|YouTube Rewind 2018|Herself
|
|-
|2018–2021
|The Pit Stop|Herself (host)
|RuPaul's Drag Race All Stars (season 4) Canada's Drag Race (season 1)RuPaul's Drag Race (season 13)RuPaul's Drag Race All Stars (season 6)|style="text-align: center;"|
|-
|2019
|The X Change Rate|Herself
|Episode: "Trixie Mattel"
|
|-
|2019–2021
|That's Our Sally|Herself
|Queerty Production
|
|-
|rowspan=2|2019–present
|Trixie Cosmetics TV|Herself (host)
|Trixie Mattel's YouTube channel
|
|-
|I Like to Watch|Herself (co-host)
|Netflix YouTube show
|style="text-align: center;"|
|-
|rowspan=6| 2020
|Trixie Mattel: One Night Only|Herself
|Musical comedy special
|style="text-align: center;"|
|-
|Bright Minded|Herself
|Episode 5
|
|-
|Trixie & Katya Save the World|Herself (co-host)
|
|style="text-align: center;"|
|-
|Gayme Show|Herself
|Episode: "Respect Kirsten"
|style="text-align: center;"|
|-
|Instant Influencer|Herself
|Guest judge
|style="text-align: center;"|
|-
|10th Annual Streamy Awards|Herself (co-host)
|
|
|-
|2020–present
|The Bald and the Beautiful|Herself (co-host)
|
|
|-
|rowspan=7| 2021
|Whiskey Ginger|Herself
|Episode: "Trixie Mattel"
|
|-
|Good for You|Herself
|Episode: "Trixie Mattel"
|
|-
|All Things Vanderpump|Herself
|Episode: "Trixie Mattel, Drag Race, and a Shocking Arrest!"
|
|-
|Werkin' Girls|Herself
|Episode: "Trixie Mattel Cracked an Egg on Ginger's Face"
|
|-
|The Badass Questionnaire|Herself
|Episode: "Trixie Mattel"
|
|-
|YouTube Pride 2021|Herself (co-host)
|
|-
|PsBattles Live|Herself
|Episode 4
|
|-
|rowspan=2| 2022
|The Comment Section|Herself
|Episode: "This B*tch Came Bald"
|
|-
|Behind the Shadows|Herself
|Episode: "What's Guillermo's Drag Name? With Trixie Mattel"
|
|}

Discography

 Two Birds (2017)
 One Stone (2018)
 Barbara (2020)
 The Blonde & Pink Albums (2022)

Tours

Headlining tours
Ages 3 and Up (2015–2017)
Now with Moving Parts Tour (2018)
Super Bowl Cut (2018)
Skinny Legend Tour (2019)
Grown Up Tour (2020–2022)

Co-headlining tours
Trixie and Katya Live! (with Katya) (2022–2023)

Bibliography
 Trixie and Katya's Guide to Modern Womanhood. Plume. 2020. .
 Working Girls: Trixie and Katya's Guide to Professional Womanhood''. Plume. 2022. .

Awards and nominations

Notes

References

External links

 
 
 
 
 Trixie Cosmetics official website Retrieved December 12, 2022.

1989 births
21st-century LGBT people
21st-century Native Americans
American autoharp players
American cosmetics businesspeople
American country musicians
American drag queens
American folk musicians
American gay musicians
American guitarists
American stand-up comedians
American YouTubers
Americana musicians
ATO Records artists
Beauty and makeup YouTubers
Folktronica musicians
Gay comedians
LGBT Native Americans
LGBT people from Wisconsin
American LGBT singers
LGBT YouTubers
Living people
Music YouTubers
Musicians from Milwaukee
Native American singers
Ojibwe people
People from Crivitz, Wisconsin
Trixie Mattel
Trixie Mattel
Singers from Wisconsin
Toy collectors
Twitch (service) streamers
Streamy Award winners
Webby Award winners
American LGBT comedians